A Flash of Light is a 1910 American short silent drama film directed by D. W. Griffith, starring Charles West and featuring Mary Pickford and Blanche Sweet.

Cast
 Charles West as John Rogers
 Vivian Prescott as Belle
 Stephanie Longfellow as The Older Sister
 Verner Clarges as The Father
 Joseph Graybill as Horace Dooley
 Dorothy Bernard
 William J. Butler as A Doctor
 Charles Craig as Wedding Guest
 Edward Dillon as At First Party
 John T. Dillon as At First Party / At Second Party (as Jack Dillon)
 Ruth Hart as At Second Party
 Guy Hedlund as At First Party / At Second Party
 Grace Henderson as Visitor
 Henry Lehrman as At Second Party (unconfirmed)
 Jeanie MacPherson
 Claire McDowell as At First Party
 George Nichols as A Doctor
 Anthony O'Sullivan as A Servant
 Alfred Paget as Wedding Guest
 Mary Pickford
 Gertrude Robinson as Wedding Guest
 W. C. Robinson as A Servant
 Mack Sennett as Wedding Guest
 George Siegmann as Wedding Guest
 Blanche Sweet
 Kate Toncray as A Servant
 Dorothy West as At First Party

See also
 List of American films of 1910
 D. W. Griffith filmography
 Mary Pickford filmography
 Blanche Sweet filmography

References

External links

1910 films
1910 short films
American silent short films
Biograph Company films
American black-and-white films
1910 drama films
Films directed by D. W. Griffith
Silent American drama films
Films with screenplays by Stanner E.V. Taylor
1910s American films